Citizen Public Market is a food hall located in Downtown Culver City, California. The food hall opened on November 18, 2020, becoming the city's first. Citizen Public Market is located in a historic 1929 Beaux Art and Art Deco landmark, The Citizen Publishing Company Building, which formerly housed the operations of The Citizen, a local newspaper from which the food hall derives its name. The two-story  space houses eight restaurants and a rooftop deck.

See also 
 Culver City, California

References

External links 

 

Shopping malls in Los Angeles County, California
Culver City, California
Food halls
Shopping malls established in 2020
2020 establishments in California
Food markets in the United States